Peclers is a trend consulting agency founded in 1970, Paris. With over 40 years of industry experience, Peclers consults with multiple brands and creative individuals in trend analysis, consumer reports, and brand strategies. The creative team at Peclers creates seasonal trend books that set the building blocks for business in the fashion and home industries. From trend forecast to styling intelligence, Peclers covers a variety of industry division in retail, beauty and cosmetics, electronics and consumer goods.

In 2003, Peclers joined WPP plc, a multinational advertising and public relation company based in London.

History
1970: Founded by Dominique Peclers in Paris, France
2001: Opened its first office in New York
2003: Joined WPP plc, a multinational advertising and public relations company in London, England
2007: Eric Duchamp joins as president of PeclersParis
2010: Opened its second office in Shanghai

Specialization
Trend Books
Brand Strategy
Creative Innovation
Trend Analysis
 Style Consulting

References

External links
 Peclers website

Fashion organizations
Cultural trends